Ahmad Yousef Al-Hassan (June 25, 1925 – April 28, 2012) was a Palestinian/Syrian/Canadian historian of Arabic and Islamic science and technology, educated in Jerusalem, Cairo, and London with a PhD in Mechanical engineering from University College London. He was Dean of Engineering and later President of the University of Aleppo where he founded the Institute for the History of Arabic Science (IHAS) and was its first director.
He also served as Minister of Petroleum, Electricity and Mineral Resources of Syria prior to 1971.
He migrated to Canada in 1982.

Positions and awards
 Visiting Professor at the Department for the History and Philosophy of Science, University College, London
 Visiting Professor at the Department of Middle East and Islamic Studies, University of Toronto
 Professor at the Institute for the History of Arabic Science (IHAS), University of Aleppo
 Recipient of the Ordre National de la Légion d'honneur of the French Republic

References

1925 births
2012 deaths
20th-century Syrian historians
Syrian Muslims
Historians of science
Historians of technology
Oil and mineral reserves ministers of Syria
Alumni of University College London
Academic staff of the University of Aleppo
People from Umm al-Fahm
Syrian emigrants to Canada
Syrian expatriates in Egypt
Syrian expatriates in the United Kingdom